The SCW North Carolina Championship was a professional wrestling regional championship in Southern Championship Wrestling (SCW). It remained active until November 20, 2004, when SCW was closed.

The title was briefly revived in G.O.U.G.E. Wrestling, the successor of SCW, when Nicky Richards was presented the title by his manager Brad Stutts following his victory over The Goat at the GOUGE supercard "Fallout" on October 17, 2008. Count Grog, founder of both SCW and GOUGE, expressed the hope that the old North Carolina title would become a true regional title by being defended in the major "indy" promotions in North Carolina.

The inaugural champion was K. C. Thunder, who defeated Big Slam in a tournament final on February 22, 1997, to become the first SCW Heavyweight Champion. C. W. Anderson, Otto Schwanz, and Juice Otto are tied with the record for most reigns, with two each. At 995 days, Seymour Snott's first and only reign is the longest in the title's history; he won the title in a championship tournament in March 2002 and held the belt up until the promotion's close in 2004. "Beastmaster" Rick Link's only reign was the shortest in the history of the title lasting 14 days. Overall, there have been 15 reigns shared between 12 wrestlers, with five vacancies, and 1 deactivation.

Title history
Key

Names

Reigns

List of combined reigns

Footnotes

References
General

Specific

External links
SCWprowrestling.com
SCW North Carolina Title at WrestlingData.com

Southern Championship Wrestling championships
State professional wrestling championships